Forestia is a genus of crabs in the family Xanthidae, containing the following species:

 Forestia abrolhensis (Montgomery, 1931)
 Forestia depressa (White, 1848)
 Forestia pascua Garth, 1985
 Forestia scabra (Odhner, 1925)

The name Forestia commemorates the French carcinologist Jacques Forest.

References

Xanthoidea